Polk Township is one of ten townships in Adair County, Missouri, United States. As of the 2010 census, its population was 639. It is named for US President James K. Polk.

Geography

The stream of Buck Branch runs through this township.

References

 USGS Geographic Names Information System (GNIS)

External links
 US-Counties.com
 City-Data.com

Townships in Adair County, Missouri
Kirksville micropolitan area, Missouri
Townships in Missouri